ESPN X-Games Pro Boarder, also known as X Games Pro Boarder, is a video game developed by Team Bear of Radical Entertainment and published by Electronic Arts and Sony Computer Entertainment Europe for the PlayStation and Windows in 1998.

Reception

The game received average reviews on both platforms according to the review aggregation website GameRankings. GameSpot gave the PlayStation version a favorable review, over a month before its U.S. release date. However, Next Generation said of the same console version, "In the end, its style-over-substance, mediocre gameplay is what you'll remember the most." In Japan, where the same console version was ported and published by ESPN Digital Games, also under the name , on March 11, 1999, Famitsu gave it a score of 28 out of 40.

References

External links
 

1998 video games
Electronic Arts games
ESPN video games
PlayStation (console) games
Snowboarding video games
Sony Interactive Entertainment games
Video games developed in Canada
Windows games